The 1860–61 United States Senate elections were held on various dates in various states. As these U.S. Senate elections were prior to the ratification of the Seventeenth Amendment in 1913, senators were chosen by state legislatures. Senators were elected over a wide range of time throughout 1860 and 1861, and a seat may have been filled months late or remained vacant due to legislative deadlock. In these elections, terms were up for the senators in Class 3.

These elections corresponded with Abraham Lincoln's election to the presidency.  The nascent Republican Party increased their Senate seats in the regular elections, and after southern Democrats withdrew to join the Confederacy, Republicans gained control of the Senate. To establish a quorum with fewer members, a lower total seat number was taken into account.

Results summary 
Senate party division, 37th Congress (1861–1863)

 Majority party: Republican (29), later rose to 30
 Minority party: Democratic (30), later dropped to 14
 Other parties: Unionist (1), later rose to 4
 Vacant: (8), later rose to 20
 Total seats: 68

Change in Senate composition

Before the elections 
After the October 2, 1860 special election in Oregon.

As a result of the elections

Beginning of the next Congress

End of 1861

Race summaries

Special elections during the 36th Congress 
In these special elections, the winners were seated during 1860 or in 1861 before March 4; ordered by election date.

Races leading to the 37th Congress 
In these regular elections, the winners were elected for the term beginning March 4, 1861; ordered by state.

All of the elections involved the Class 3 seats.

Elections during the 37th Congress 
In these elections, the winners were elected in 1861 after March 4.

Maryland 

James Pearce won re-election by an unknown margin of votes, for the Class 3 seat.

New York 

The New York election was held February 5, 1861.

Whig William H. Seward had been re-elected in February 1855 to this seat, had become a Republican upon the foundation of that party in September 1855, and his term would expire on March 3, 1861. Seward did not seek re-election, instead being certain to be appointed to an office in the incoming Lincoln administration (Lincoln subsequently appointed Seward Secretary of State).

At the State election in November 1859, 23 Republicans and 9 Democrats were elected for a two-year term (1860-1861) in the State Senate. At the State election in November 1860, 93 Republicans and 35 Democrats were elected to the Assembly for the session of 1861. The 84th New York State Legislature met from January 1 to April 16, 1861, at Albany, New York.

Ira Harris was the candidate of the Republican Party. Harris had been a Whig assemblyman in 1845 and 1846, and a justice of the New York Supreme Court from 1847 to 1859.

Ex-Governor Horatio Seymour (in office 1853-1854) was the candidate of the Democratic Party.

Both in the Assembly and the Senate a strict party vote confirmed the caucus selections.

In the Assembly 119 votes were given: Republicans Smith Anthony (Cayuga Co.), Martin Finch (Essex Co.), Henry A. Prendergast (Chautauqua Co.), Victor M. Rice (Erie Co.) and Perez H. Field (Ontario Co.), along with Democrats Luke F. Cozans (NYC), Benjamin H. Long (Erie Co.), N. Holmes Odell (Westchester Co.) and Christian B. Woodruff (NYC) did not vote.

In the State Senate, 31 votes were given as William H. Ferry (Rep., 19th D.) was absent.

Ira Harris was the choice of both the Assembly and the Senate, and was declared elected.

Pennsylvania 

There were two elections in Pennsylvania.

Pennsylvania (regular) 

The regular election in Pennsylvania was held January 8, 1861. Edgar Cowan was elected by the Pennsylvania General Assembly to the United States Senate.

Incumbent Democrat William Bigler, who was elected in 1856, was not a candidate for re-election to another term. The Pennsylvania General Assembly, consisting of the House of Representatives and the Senate, convened on January 8, 1861, to elect a new Senator to fill the term beginning on March 4, 1861. The results of the vote of both houses combined are as follows:

Pennsylvania (special) 

A special election was held in Pennsylvania on March 14, 1861. 
David Wilmot was elected by the Pennsylvania General Assembly to the United States Senate.

Republican Simon Cameron had been elected to the United States Senate by the General Assembly, consisting of the House of Representatives and the Senate, in January 1857. After Senator Cameron resigned his seat on March 4, 1861, to become United States Secretary of War in Abraham Lincoln's administration, the Pennsylvania General Assembly convened on March 14, 1861, to elect a new Senator to fill the vacancy.

The results of the vote of both houses combined are as follows:

See also
 1860 United States elections
 1860 United States presidential election
 1860–61 United States House of Representatives elections
 36th United States Congress
 37th United States Congress

Notes

References

 Party Division in the Senate, 1789-Present, via Senate.gov
The New York Civil List compiled by Franklin Benjamin Hough, Stephen C. Hutchins and Edgar Albert Werner, 1867 (see pg. 568 for U. S. Senators; pg. 442 for State Senators 1861; pg. 492ff for Members of Assembly 1861)
Result NY state election 1859 in The Tribune Almanac for 1860 compiled by Horace Greeley of the New York Tribune
Result NY state election 1860 in The Tribune Almanac for 1861 compiled by Horace Greeley of the New York Tribune
FROM THE STATE CAPITAL.; Election of United States Senator in NYT on February 6, 1861
Result, NY State Senate:  Journal of the Senate (84th Session) (1861; pg. 137)
Result, NY Assembly: Journal of the Assembly (84th Session) (1861; pg. 247f)
Pennsylvania Election Statistics: 1682-2006 from the Wilkes University Election Statistics Project.